The Tasmanian Government Railways H class was a class of  steam locomotives operated by the Tasmanian Government Railways.

History
In 1889, 1891 and 1892 three similar 0-4-0WT locomotives were built by Lokomotivfabrik Krauss & Co, Germany use by contractors building railway lines in Tasmania. All were purchased by the Tasmanian Government Railways who purchased a fourth locomotive new. They primarily were used as shunters.

In 1906, H2 and H3 were sold to the Victorian Public Works Department. The former was sold again in 1908 to the Corrimal Colliery while H3 was sold in 1910 to the Rubicon Timber Company. H4 was sold in 1927 to the Catamaran Colliery in Tasmania.

Namesake
The H class designation was reused by the H class introduced in 1951.

References

Railway locomotives introduced in 1889
Steam locomotives of Tasmania
0-4-0WT locomotives
2 ft gauge locomotives